This is the discography of Tom Petty, who was an American singer, songwriter and musician. Petty released 13 studio albums as the lead singer of Tom Petty and the Heartbreakers in addition to three solo albums.

Albums

Studio albums with the Heartbreakers

Solo albums

Live and compilation albums

Other appearances

Studio

Live

Guest appearances

Singles

Other charted songs
"Nightwatchman" (1981) No. 21 US Mainstream Rock
"We Stand a Chance" (1982) No. 37 US Mainstream Rock
"Between Two Worlds" (1982) No. 35 US Mainstream Rock
"One Story Town" (1982) No. 15 US Mainstream Rock
"Feel a Whole Lot Better" (1989) No. 18 US Mainstream Rock
"Love Is a Long Road" (1989) No. 7 US Mainstream Rock
"Wildflowers" (1994) No. 16 US Hot Rock Songs, No. 11 on the Billboard Rock Digital Song Sales and No. 3 Billboard Lyric Find.
"Cabin Down Below" (1995) No. 29 US Mainstream Rock
"Waiting for Tonight" (1995) No. 6 US Mainstream Rock, No. 1 US AAA
"High in the Morning" (2010) No. 23 US AAA

Guest singles

Other charted guest songs

Releases with the Traveling Wilburys

Albums

Singles

Other charted songs

Releases with Mudcrutch

Albums

Live albums

Extended plays

Singles

Videos and DVDs

References

Discography
Rock music discographies
Discographies of American artists